Juan Alfredo Torres González (31 May 1935 – 10 November 2022) was a Mexican footballer who played as a forward. He represented the Mexico national team in the 1954 FIFA World Cup.

Career
Torres began playing youth football with local side Club Imperio. He joined Club Atlas at age 16, and would spend nearly twenty years playing for the club. He also participated in the first match held at Estadio Jalisco on 31 January 1960.

After he retired from playing football in 1970, Torres became a manager. He led Atlas on several occasions, helping the club gain promotion to the Primera in the 1971–72 and 1978–79 seasons.

References

External links

1935 births
2022 deaths
People from Zapopan, Jalisco
Mexican footballers
Footballers from Jalisco
Association football forwards
Mexico international footballers
1954 FIFA World Cup players
Liga MX players
Atlas F.C. footballers
Mexican football managers
Atlas F.C. managers